The Chloroflexi-1 RNA motif is a conserved RNA structure detected by bioinformatics within the species Chloroflexus aggregans. C. aggregans has three predicted Chloroflexi-1 RNAs, which are located nearby to one another.  This arrangement might suggest a repetitive element. C. aggregans is classified as belonging to the bacterial phylum Chloroflexota (formerly Chloroflexi).

See also
Acido-Lenti-1 RNA motif
Bacteroidales-1 RNA motif
Collinsella-1 RNA motif
Flavo-1 RNA motif

References

External links
 

Non-coding RNA